Andrew Cunningham was the chief executive of the FTSE 250 Index listed company Grainger plc. He retired from the position in February 2016 and was replaced by Helen Gordon.

References 

Living people
Year of birth missing (living people)
British chief executives